Le Militant is the official weekly newspaper of the Mauritian Militant Movement.

History
Le Militant was founded in 1970.

Website
Lemilitant.com is the online version of the newspaper. It includes the free-to-download PDF version of the newspaper.

See also
List of newspapers in Mauritius

References

External links
 www.lemilitant.com

1970 establishments in Mauritius
Newspapers published in Mauritius
Publications established in 1970
Communism in Mauritius
French-language newspapers published in Africa
Weekly newspapers